Elginshire and Nairnshire was a county constituency in Scotland.  From 1832 to 1918, it returned one Member of Parliament (MP) to the House of Commons of the Parliament of the United Kingdom, elected by the first-past-the-post voting system.

Boundaries 

The constituency was created in 1832 by the Scottish Reform Act 1832 by a merger of two former constituencies: Elginshire and Nairnshire. It extended to the counties of Elginshire and Nairnshire, with the exception of the burghs of Elgin, Nairn and Forres which were instead part of Inverness Burghs and Elgin Burghs.

It was replaced in 1918 by the new Moray and Nairn constituency, which included all of Elginshire and Nairnshire, including the burghs of Elgin, Nairn and Forres.

Members of Parliament

Politics and history of the constituency 
Prior to the 1832 Reform Act, Nairnshire was normally controlled by the Dukes of Argyll or Campbells, the number of voters varying between 15 and 30. The Grants dominated Elginshire which had around 30 voters; both constituencies objected to the merger but without result.

The Act increased the electorate to about 650–700; after 1832, the seat was contested only once in 1841, returning a Conservative until the Liberals took the seat in 1874.

Elections

Elections in the 1830s

Elections in the 1840s
Ogilvy-Grant resigned by accepting the office of Steward of the Chiltern Hundreds, causing a by-election.

Elections in the 1850s

Elections in the 1860s

Elections in the 1870s

Duff succeeded to the peerage, becoming Earl of Fife.

Elections in the 1880s 

Anderson's death caused a by-election.

Elections in the 1890s

Elections in the 1900s

Elections in the 1910s 

General Election 1914–15:

Another General Election was required to take place before the end of 1915. The political parties had been making preparations for an election to take place and by July 1914, the following candidates had been selected; 
Liberal: Archibald Williamson
Unionist:

References 

Politics of Moray
Historic parliamentary constituencies in Scotland (Westminster)
Constituencies of the Parliament of the United Kingdom established in 1832
Constituencies of the Parliament of the United Kingdom disestablished in 1918
Politics of the county of Nairn
Elginshire